Heraclius (died March 16, 455) was an influential eunuch of the Western Roman Emperor Valentinian III.

Heraclius was a eunuch and the primicerius sacri cubiculi of the Western Roman Emperor Valentinian III, on whom he had a great influence.

Heraclius was an enemy of the powerful general Aetius, and allied himself with the senator Petronius Maximus, who also opposed Aetius. The two of them convinced Valentinian that Aetius wanted to kill him, and the Emperor killed Aetius in 454. However, his alliance with Petronius ended with the death of Aetius: when Petronius asked to be conferred the consulship and the patriciate, Heraclius advised Valentinian to refuse.

One year later, in 455, Optila and Thraustila, two barbarian officers in Valentinian's service but loyal to Aetius, killed the Emperor by order of Petronius while Valentinian was on the Campus Martius to train with the bow; on the same occasion, Thraustila killed Heraclius.

Notes

Bibliography

Primary sources 
 Evagrius Scholasticus, ii.7
 Hydatius, 160
 Jordanes, Romana, 334
 John of Antioch, fragments 200-201
 Marcellinus Comes, s.a. 455
 Prosper of Aquitaine, s.a. 454-455
 Theophanes the Confessor, AM 5946
 Victor of Tunnuna, s.a. 455

Secondary sources 
 Jones, Arnold Hugh Martin, John Robert Martindale, John Morris, "Heraclius 3", The Prosopography of the Later Roman Empire, volume 1, Cambridge University Press, 1992, p. 541.

455 deaths
5th-century Romans
Ancient Roman eunuchs
Late Roman Empire political office-holders
Year of birth unknown